Miskolc is a district in central-western part of Borsod-Abaúj-Zemplén County. Miskolc is also the name of the town where the district seat is found. The district is located in the Northern Hungary Statistical Region.

Geography 
Miskolc District borders with Kazincbarcika District, Edelény District and Szikszó District to the north, Szerencs District and Tiszaújváros District to the east, Mezőcsát District to the south, Mezőkövesd District to the southwest, Eger District and Bélapátfalva District (Heves County) to the west. The number of the inhabited places in Miskolc District is 39.

Municipalities 
The district has 1 urban county, 6 towns, 1 large village and 31 villages.
(ordered by population, as of 1 January 2012)

The bolded municipalities are cities, italics municipality is large village.

Demographics

In 2011, it had a population of 250,530 and the population density was 258/km².

Ethnicity
Besides the Hungarian majority, the main minorities are the Roma (approx. 12,500), German (1,200), Slovak (1,000), Rusyn and Romanian (300), Polish, Russian and Bulgarian (200), Greek and Ukrainian (150) and Arab (100).

Total population (2011 census): 250,530
Ethnic groups (2011 census): Identified themselves: 232,864 persons:
Hungarians: 215,090 (92.37%)
Gypsies: 12,061 (5.18%)
Others and indefinable: 5,713 (2.45%)
Approx. 18,000 persons in Miskolc District did not declare their ethnic group at the 2011 census.

Religion
Religious adherence in the county according to 2011 census:

Catholic – 90,927 (Roman Catholic – 80,143; Greek Catholic – 10,765);
Reformed – 44,505;
Evangelical – 1,925;
other religions – 4,215; 
Non-religious – 35,919; 
Atheism – 3,197;
Undeclared – 69,842.

Gallery

See also
List of cities and towns of Hungary
Miskolc Subregion (until 2013)

References

External links
 Postal codes of the Miskolc District

Districts in Borsod-Abaúj-Zemplén County